Big Iron Horses is the fifth studio album by American country music group Restless Heart. It was released by RCA Nashville in 1992. "When She Cries," "Mending Fences," "We Got the Love" and the title track were released as singles. The album reached #26 on the Top Country Albums chart and has been certified Gold by the RIAA. This is also the band's first album not to feature lead vocalist Larry Stewart, who departed in 1991. Conversely, drummer John Dittrich, keyboardist Dave Innis, and bassist Paul Gregg alternate as lead vocalists on this album.

Track listing

 On some releases of the album, the song "Tell Me What You Dream" replaces "We're Gonna Be OK" as track 6.

Personnel 

Restless Heart
 Greg Jennings – acoustic guitar, electric guitar, mandolin, backing vocals
 Dave Innis – keyboards, backing vocals, lead vocals (3, 6, 9), string arrangements (10)
 Paul Gregg – bass, backing vocals, lead vocals (1, 5, 8)
 John Dittrich – drums, percussion, backing vocals, lead vocals (2, 4, 7, 10 & "Tell Me What You Dream")

Additional musicians
 Carl Marsh – keyboards ("Tell Me What You Dream"), string arrangements (10)
 Josh Leo – electric rhythm guitar (2, 7, 8)
 Bernie Leadon – banjo (2)
 Bruce Gaitsch – rhythm guitar (3, 9)
 Jim Horn – saxophone (8)
 Warren Hill – saxophone ("Tell Me What You Dream")

Production 
 Restless Heart – producers
 Josh Leo – producer 
 Steve Marcantonio – recording, mixing 
 Jeff Giedt – additional engineer 
 Mark Frigo – assistant engineer
 Denny Purcell – mastering 
 Mary Hamilton – art direction 
 Juliana Hammond – design 
 Kym Juister – design 
 Jim "Señor" McGuire – photography 
 Ron Keith – train photos, photo illustration
 Mary Beth Felts – hair, make-up 
 Ann Rice – wardrobe stylist 
 Bill Simmons – management
 Fitzgerald Hartley Co. – management
 Mastered at Georgetown Masters (Nashville, TN).

Chart performance

References 

1992 albums
Restless Heart albums
RCA Records albums
Albums produced by Josh Leo